{{DISPLAYTITLE:C13H20N2O3S}}
The molecular formula C13H20N2O3S may refer to:

 Articaine, a dental amide-type local anesthetic
 Etozolin, a loop diuretic used in Europe

Molecular formulas